Joseph Clemens of Bavaria (5 December 1671 – 12 November 1723) was a member of the Wittelsbach dynasty of Bavaria and Archbishop-Elector of Cologne from 1688 to 1723.

Biography

The third son of Ferdinand Maria of Bavaria and his wife, Henrietta Adelaide of Savoy, Joseph Clemens was designated by his parents for a life in the church.  He became Archbishop of Cologne in 1688 after the death of Maximilian Henry of Bavaria, and his appointment to that post by Pope Innocent XI was one cause of the Nine Years' War.  He later also served as Prince-Bishop of Liège, of Regensburg, of Freising and of Hildesheim.

As did his brother Maximilian II Emanuel, Elector of Bavaria, Joseph Clemens allied with France during the War of Spanish Succession and was forced to flee his residence Bonn in 1702 and found refuge at the French court.  Joseph Clemens was put under the ban of the Empire and deprived of his lands in 1706.

The war between France and the Empire was finally ended in 1714 with the Treaty of Baden, which restored Joseph Clemens. He died in Bonn, and was buried at the Cologne Cathedral. Joseph Clemens was succeeded by his nephew Clemens August of Bavaria.

Bibliography
Alessandro Cont, La Chiesa dei principi. Le relazioni tra Reichskirche, dinastie sovrane tedesche e stati italiani (1688–1763), preface of Elisabeth Garms-Cornides, Trento, Provincia autonoma di Trento, 2018, pp. 19–55, https://www.academia.edu/38170694/La_Chiesa_dei_principi._Le_relazioni_tra_Reichskirche_dinastie_sovrane_tedesche_e_stati_italiani_1688-1763_prefazione_di_Elisabeth_Garms-Cornides_Trento_Provincia_autonoma_di_Trento_2018

1671 births
1723 deaths
Archbishop-Electors of Cologne
House of Wittelsbach
17th-century Roman Catholic archbishops in the Holy Roman Empire
18th-century Roman Catholic archbishops in the Holy Roman Empire
Burials at Cologne Cathedral
Prince-Bishops of Liège
Prince-Bishops of Hildesheim
Nobility from Munich
Roman Catholic Prince-Bishops of Freising
17th-century Roman Catholic bishops in Bavaria
Sons of monarchs